The Lord of Skelton was a title in the Peerage of England.

Robert de Brus (??-1141/1142)
Adam I de Brus (1142-1167)
Adam II de Brus (1167-1188)
Peter I de Brus (1188-1222)
Peter II de Brus (1222-1240)
Peter III de Brus (1240-1272)

References
The Bruses of Skelton and William of Aumale, Yorkshire Archeology Journal (2001)

English feudal baronies